Edward Barnett may refer to:

 Edward Barnett (cricketer) (1818–1899), English cricketer
 Edward Charles Barnett (1854–1922), Australian businessman and politician
 Edward Willis Barnett (1899–1987), American Olympic fencer and photographer
 Edward William Barnett (1835–1895), British politician